Yargatenga is a department (or commune) of Koulpélogo Province in eastern Burkina Faso. Its capital is the town of Yargatenga. According to the 2019 census, the department had a total population of 56,739.

Towns and villages
 Yargatenga (3,593 inhabitants) (capital)
  Bama (233 inhabitants) 
  Besseme (893 inhabitants) 
  Bilemtenga (2,544 inhabitants) 
  Bou (783 inhabitants) 
  Cinkansé (9,360 inhabitants) 
  Dirihoré (1,050 inhabitants) 
  Doukbolé (734 inhabitants) 
  Hornogo (1,988 inhabitants) 
 Kampoaga (1,572 inhabitants) 
  Kiniwaga (527 inhabitants) 
  Kiongo (1,461 inhabitants) 
  Métémété (663 inhabitants) 
  Sibtenga (1,266 inhabitants) 
  Tounougou Toné (1,263 inhabitants) 
  Waongo (4,127 inhabitants) 
 Yoyo (2,449 inhabitants) 
 Zoaga (1,691 inhabitants)

References

Departments of Burkina Faso
Koulpélogo Province